Andrea Prat (born 1967) is an Italian economist. He is the Richard Paul Richman Professor of Business and Professor of Economics at Columbia University. He first studied economics at the University of Turin and then obtained his PhD in 1997 at Stanford University under the supervision of Kenneth Arrow. Andrea Prat has also taught at the London School of Economics and at Tilburg University.

He served as chairman and managing editor of the Review of Economic Studies. He is an associate editor of Theoretical Economics. Andrea Prat is a Fellow of the British Academy and of the Econometric Society.

References

External links

 Columbia University web page

1967 births
Living people
Fellows of the British Academy
Fellows of the Econometric Society
20th-century  Italian economists
21st-century  Italian economists
Stanford University alumni
University of Turin alumni
Columbia University faculty